London Pulse is an English netball team based at the Copper Box Arena in Queen Elizabeth Olympic Park, Stratford, London. Since 2019 their senior team has played in the Netball Superleague.

History

National Performance League
London Pulse was originally founded in 2016. Former England netball international, Natalie Seaton founded the franchise and subsequently became the CEO.  London Pulse initially entered under-17 and under-19 teams in England Netball's National Performance League. They also launched a campaign to become a Netball Superleague franchise. In 2018 London Pulse won the National Performance League under-19 title after they beat defending champions, Manchester Thunder, 53–43 in the final. During the play-off tournament they also defeated the under-19 teams of other Netball Superleague teams including Hertfordshire Mavericks, Wasps Netball, Surrey Storm and Team Bath.

Netball Superleague
In July 2018 it was announced that London Pulse would replace Team Northumbria for the 2019 Netball Superleague season. They are the first team in the Netball Superleague to represent Central London. On 5 January 2019 London Pulse made their Netball Superleague debut with a 51–49 win against Severn Stars at Arena Birmingham.

Home venue
London Pulse is based at the Copper Box Arena in Queen Elizabeth Olympic Park, Stratford, London.

Notable players

2023 Squad

Internationals

 Ama Agbeze
 Lindsay Keable
 Chioma Matthews

 Michelle Drayne
 Fionnuala Toner

 Adean Thomas

 Sigrid Burger

Head coaches

References

External links
  London Pulse on Twitter
 London Pulse on Facebook

Netball Superleague teams
Netball teams in England
Pulse
Sports clubs established in 2016
2016 establishments in England
Queen Elizabeth Olympic Park